Girabola, or Campeonato Nacional de Futebol em Séniores Masculinos, is the top division of Angolan football. It is organized by the Angolan Football Federation.

The league winner and runner-up qualify for the CAF Champions League.

Girabola ZAP
In January 2016, Angolan subscription TV satellite and cable provider ZAP, the Angolan Football Federation and the Girabola clubs, signed a three-year deal in which ZAP will have broadcast rights over all Girabola matches. As part of the deal, the Angolan state-owned TV station TPA will be allowed to broadcast one game per week on its free-view platform. Also as part of the deal, the Girabola changes its denomination to Girabola ZAP.

Qualification for African competitions

Association ranking for 2020–21 CAF competitions
Association ranking for 2020–21 CAF Champions League and 2020–21 CAF Confederation Cup will be based on results from each CAF tournament (Champions League and Confederation Cup) from 2016 to 2019–20.

Legend
 CL: CAF Champions League
 CC: CAF Confederation Cup

2021-22 Girabola teams 
Académica do Lobito (Lobito, Benguela)
Bravos do Maquis (Luena, Moxico)
Cuando Cubango FC (Kuito, Bié)
Desportivo da Huíla (Lubango, Huíla)
Interclube (Luanda)
Kabuscorp (Luanda)
Lunda Sul (Saurimo, Lunda Sul)
Petro de Luanda (Luanda)
Primeiro de Agosto (Luanda)
Progresso do Sambizanga (Luanda)
Recreativo da Caála (Caála, Huambo)
Recreativo do Libolo (Libolo, Kwanza Sul)
Sagrada Esperança (Dundo, Lunda Norte)
Sporting de Benguela (Benguela)
Sporting de Cabinda (Cabinda)
Wiliete (Benguela)

List of champions before independence 
The list of champions includes the national champions in the colonial period.

 (Campeonato Provincial de Angola)

1941: Sporting de Luanda
1942: Sporting de Luanda
1943: Benfica de Benguela
1944: Sporting de Luanda
1945: Sport Clube da Catumbela
1946: Sporting de Luanda
1947: Sporting de Luanda
1948: unknown
1949: unknown
1950: unknown
1951: Ferroviário de Nova Lisboa
1952: Portugal de Benguela
1953: Ferroviário de Luanda
1954: Lobito Sports Clube
1955: Sporting de Luanda
1956: Sporting de Luanda
1957: Ferroviário de Nova Lisboa
1958: Sport Clube da Catumbela
1959: Portugal de Benguela
1960: Portugal de Benguela
1961: Portugal de Benguela
1962: Ferroviário de Luanda
1963: Sporting de Luanda
1964: Portugal de Benguela
1965: Atlético Sport Aviação
1966: Atlético Sport Aviação
1967: Atlético Sport Aviação
1968: Atlético Sport Aviação
1969: Independente Sport Clube
1970: Independente Sport Clube
1971: Independente Sport Clube
1972: Benfica de Nova Lisboa
1973: Futebol Clube do Moxico
1974: Ferroviário de Nova Lisboa
1975: Recreativo da Caála

Titles by team

Since independence (Girabola)

Titles by team

Topscorers

Girabola participation details

2000s

1979-1999

Rádio 5 Awards

See also
 List of Girabola seasons
 Girabola Clubs Participation Details
 List of Girabola players during 2014 season
 Angola Cup
 Angola Super Cup
 Angola 2nd Division

References

External links 
Girabola.com – Updated Standings and News
Claque magazine
League at fifa.com
Girabola summary(SOCCERWAY)

 
1
Angola